Mary of Lusignan (1381 - 4 September 1404) was a Queen consort of Naples, married to King Ladislaus of Naples. 

She was born in Genoa. Mary was a daughter of James I of Cyprus and his Queen consort Helvis of Brunswick-Grubenhagen.

On 12 February 1403, Mary married Ladislaus of Naples. He had divorced his previous wife, Constance of Clermont, in 1392 while struggling for the throne against Louis II of Naples. He had no legitimate heirs of his own.

Mary died childless in Naples the following year. Ladislaus went on to marry Mary of Enghien.

References

|-

1381 births
1404 deaths
Nobility from Genoa
Royal consorts of Naples
15th-century Italian women
Italian people of Cypriot descent
Mary
Daughters of kings